Albania competed at the 2012 Summer Paralympics in London, United Kingdom from August 29 to September 9, 2012.

Cycling

Road

Men

See also

 Albania at the 2012 Summer Olympics

References

Nations at the 2012 Summer Paralympics
2012
2012 in Albanian sport